The Chios Byzantine Museum is a museum in Chios, Greece, housed in an Ottoman-era mosque that was known as the Mecidiye Mosque.

History 
The mosque was called Mecidiye Mosque and was built in the 19th century by sultan Abdul Mecid I. During the years 2006 to 2010 the museum underwent repair work, so it remained closed. The museum houses Christian and Byzantine sculptures in its yard, as well as exhibits from the Genoese and Ottoman periods of Chios' history.

See also 
 Islam in Greece
 List of museums in Greece
 List of mosques in Greece

References

External links 
 Hellenic Ministry of Culture and Tourism
 Hellenic Ministry of Foreign Affairs

Buildings and structures in Chios
Byzantine museums in Greece
Museums in the North Aegean
Ottoman mosques in Greece
Former mosques in Greece
Ottoman Chios
19th-century mosques
19th-century architecture in Greece